Günter Busch (15 February 1930 – 9 August 2006) was a German footballer. He played in two matches for the East Germany national football team from 1954 to 1957.

References

External links
 

1930 births
2006 deaths
East German footballers
East Germany international footballers
People from Leipzig (district)
Association football goalkeepers
BSG Chemie Leipzig (1950) players
1. FC Lokomotive Leipzig players